Charles-Marie Philippe de Kerhallet (17 September 1809, in Rennes – 16 February 1863, in Paris) was a French navigator. He received his education in the naval school of Angoulême, became a midshipman in 1825, and was promoted captain in 1849. He served in South America, commanded the stations of Newfoundland and Cayenne, made soundings in the Gulf of Mexico, and prepared valuable charts. His works include Instructions pour remonter la côte du Brésil depuis San Luiz de Maranhão jusqu'au Para (Paris, 1841); Description nautique de la côte du Mexique (1849); Description nautique de la côte de l'isthme de Panama (1850); Considérations générales sur l'Océan Atlantique (1852); Considérations générales sur l'Ocean Pacifique (1853); and La navigation dans la mer des Antilles et le golfe du Mexique (1859).

See also
 List of colonial heads of Côte d'Ivoire

Notes

References
 

1809 births
1863 deaths
French navigators
Burials at Père Lachaise Cemetery